Ascension is the tenth studio album by Djam Karet, released on May 22, 2001 by HC Productions.

Track listing

Personnel 
Adapted from Ascension liner notes.

Djam Karet
 Gayle Ellett – electric guitar, 8-string lute, organ, wooden flute, synthesizer, tape, electronics, tape, electronics
 Mike Henderson – electric guitar, acoustic guitar, 12-string acoustic guitar, lap steel slide guitar, percussion, goblet drum, tape, electronics
 Chuck Oken, Jr. – drums, percussion, synthesizer, programming
 Henry J. Osborne – 5-string bass guitar, didgeridoo

Production and additional personnel
 Djam Karet – production

Release history

References

External links 
 Ascension at Discogs (list of releases)
 Ascension at Bandcamp

2001 albums
Djam Karet albums